The World Is Outside is the debut album by English band Ghosts, released in 2007.

Track listing
 "Stay the Night" – 3:42
 "Musical Chairs" – 3:41
 "The World Is Outside" – 3:35
 "Ghosts" – 3:51
 "Mind Games" – 3:29
 "Something Hilarious" – 5:14
 "Stop" – 4:05
 "Over-Analysis" – 4:17
 "Further and Further Away" – 4:07
 "Wrapped Up in Little Stars" – 5:53
 "Temporary" – 6:44

References

2007 debut albums
Indie pop albums by English artists
Atlantic Records albums